Prony analysis (Prony's method) was developed by Gaspard Riche de Prony in 1795. However, practical use of the method awaited the digital computer. Similar to the Fourier transform, Prony's method extracts valuable information from a uniformly sampled signal and builds a series of damped complex exponentials or damped sinusoids. This allows for the estimation of frequency, amplitude, phase and damping components of a signal.

The method 

Let  be a signal consisting of  evenly spaced samples. Prony's method fits a function

to the observed . After some manipulation utilizing Euler's formula, the following result is obtained. This allows more direct computation of terms.

where:
  are the eigenvalues of the system,
  are the damping components,
  are the angular frequency components
  are the phase components,
  are the amplitude components of the series, and
  is the imaginary unit.

Representations 

Prony's method is essentially a decomposition of a signal with  complex exponentials via the following process:

Regularly sample  so that the -th of  samples may be written as

If  happens to consist of damped sinusoids, then there will be pairs of complex exponentials such that

where

Because the summation of complex exponentials is the homogeneous solution to a linear difference equation, the following difference equation will exist:

The key to Prony's Method is that the coefficients in the difference equation are related to the following polynomial:

These facts lead to the following three steps within Prony's Method:

1) Construct and solve the matrix equation for the  values:

Note that if , a generalized matrix inverse may be needed to find the values .

2) After finding the  values find the roots (numerically if necessary) of the polynomial

3) With the  values the  values are part of a system of linear equations that may be used to solve for the  values:

where  unique values  are used. It is possible to use a generalized matrix inverse if more than  samples are used.

This leads to the same Nyquist sampling criteria that discrete Fourier transforms are subject to:

See also 
Generalized pencil-of-function method
Computation of Prony decomposition using Autoregression analysis
Application of Prony decomposition in Time-frequency analysis

Notes

References 

 
 

Signal processing